Glenea diana is a species of beetle in the family Cerambycidae. It was described by James Thomson in 1865.

Subspecies
 Glenea diana diana Thomson, 1865
 Glenea diana niasana Breuning, 1969

References

diana
Beetles described in 1865